John Jackson (born January 2, 1967 in Brooklyn, New York) is an American sports commentator who works for ESPN Radio 710 and FSN West and formerly played professional American football.  "JJ," as he is referenced by his on-air colleagues, co-hosts the Lexus Gauntlet Show and the USC Press Conference Show, and serves as an analyst for Trojans Live.  He serves as a sideline reporter during USC football games for 710 ESPN.

High school and college
Jackson prepped at Bishop Amat Memorial High School in La Puente, California.

Jackson was an athletic and academic All-American at the University of Southern California and also played baseball. He was team MVP in 1989.

Professional career
Jackson played wide receiver for the National Football League Phoenix Cardinals between 1990 and 1992 and for the Chicago Bears in 1996.

He also played in Minor League Baseball from 1990 to 1995 with the San Francisco Giants, California Angels and Minnesota Twins organizations.

References

1967 births
Living people
American expatriate baseball players in Canada
American football wide receivers
Baseball players from California
Chicago Bears players
Everett Giants players
Hardware City Rock Cats players
Midland Angels players
People from Diamond Bar, California
Phoenix Cardinals players
USC Trojans baseball players
USC Trojans football announcers
USC Trojans football players
Salt Lake Buzz players
San Jose Giants players
Vancouver Canadians players